Jacques-Marie Beauvarlet-Charpentier (31 July 1766 – 7 September 1834) was a French organist and composer.

Biography 
Born in Lyon, Jacques-Marie Beauvarlet-Charpentier succeeded his father Jean-Jacques Beauvarlet Charpentier at the pipe organ of the Église Saint-Paul. After the French Revolution, he got the incumbent position at Saint-Germain-des-Prés, and in 1815, that of Saint-Eustache.

In addition to vocal works on patriotic and sacred texts, he is also responsible for Pièces pour piano-forte, Romances, 6 Magnificat, 2 Te Deum, 6 Hymnes pour les principales fêtes de l'année, 15 noëls, organ masses, a Journal d'orgue published from 1822.

The best known piece of Jacques-Marie Beauvarlet-Charpentier is Victoire de l’Armée d’Italie or Bataille de Montenotte, for forte-piano, or organ, published in Paris c. 1797.

He died in Paris on 7 September 1834.

Bibliography 
 .
 Journal des Artistes Obituary.
 David Fuller and Bruce Gustafson. Beauvarlet-Charpentier, Jacques-Marie Grove Music Online. Oxford Music Online. Oxford University Press. Web. 8 November 2012.

References

External links 
 Jacques-Marie Beauvarlet-Charpentier on MUSOPEN
 Jacques-Marie Beauvarlet-Charpentier on Musicalics
 IMSLP Scores.
 Bataille de Montenotte - Jacques-Marie Beauvarlet-Charpentier (1766 - 1834) on YouTube
 Jacques-Marie Beauvarlet-Charpentier on data.bnf.fr

French classical organists
French male organists
French classical composers
French male classical composers
French composers of sacred music
1766 births
Musicians from Lyon
1834 deaths
Male classical organists